Benjamin or Ben Murphy may refer to:
 Ben Murphy (Benjamin Edward Murphy, born 1942), American actor
 B. Frank Murphy (Benjamin Franklin Murphy, 1867–1938), American politician from Ohio
 B. Russell Murphy (Benjamin Russell Murphy, 1889–1957), American athlete and coach
 Ben Murphy (rugby union, born 1996), Welsh rugby union player
 Ben Murphy (rugby union, born 2001), Irish rugby union player
 Ben Murphy (aviator) (born 1975), British pilot
 Ben Murphy (American football), American football coach